The Shanty Where Santy Claus Lives is a 1933 Christmas-themed Warner Bros. Merrie Melodies animated short film directed by Rudolf Ising. The short was released on January 7, 1933.

It makes use of a Great Depression setting of Christmas where Santa Claus is seeking shelter. The short takes place at a shantytown; hence the name "The Shanty Where Santy Claus Lives".

Plot

On Christmas Eve, a sad and lonely boy walks past a church and listens to the people inside sing "Silent Night". He walks past a house, and watches the people celebrate Christmas with their family. Suddenly, a gust of wind blows, knocks him against the wall of a nearby tool shed, and covers him in snow. When he returns home, the boy opens his stocking, and discovers nothing inside. As he lies in a chair there crying, he hears the sound of sleigh bells ringing. He goes by the window, and sees that it's Santa Claus! The boy joins Santa for some holiday fun in the shanty where he lives, since the boy has been good all year.

The joy in Santa's shanty includes singing toys, a jazz band, and a singing doll (some albeit blackface). Eventually, a Christmas tree catches fire, and everybody does what they can to put it out. The boy manages to put out the fire by connecting a hose to bagpipes, squirting the tree, and putting out the fire. Everybody cheers as the cartoon ends.

Home media
This cartoon is available on "The Golden Age of Looney Tunes Vol. 3" laserdisc.

This cartoon has fallen into the public domain and therefore can be found on many low budget VHS and DVD releases.

In popular culture
Was featured in the 2006 film Unaccompanied Minors
Was riffed by RiffTrax as a short to accompany The Magic Christmas Tree

See also
 List of Christmas films
 Santa Claus in film

References

External links
 
 
 The Shanty Where Santa Claus Lives on MUBI

1933 films
1933 animated films
1930s Christmas films
American black-and-white films
American Christmas films
Animated Christmas films
Films scored by Frank Marsales
Films directed by Rudolf Ising
Great Depression films
Merrie Melodies short films
Warner Bros. Cartoons animated short films
Santa Claus in film
1930s Warner Bros. animated short films